In Greek mythology, Ptous (Ancient Greek: Πτῶος) may refer to the following:

 Ptous, eponym of Mount Ptous in Boeotia on which the town Acraephnium was situated. He was believed to have been a son of either Athamas and Themisto, or of Acraepheus and Euxippe, or of Apollo and Zeuxippe, a daughter of Athamas.
 Ptous, also an epithet of Apollo, under which the god was honored in a temple near Acraephnium. The epithet was believed to be linked to the name of the above Ptous as well.

Notes

References 

 Apollodorus, The Library with an English Translation by Sir James George Frazer, F.B.A., F.R.S. in 2 Volumes, Cambridge, MA, Harvard University Press; London, William Heinemann Ltd. 1921. ISBN 0-674-99135-4. Online version at the Perseus Digital Library. Greek text available from the same website.
Pausanias, Description of Greece with an English Translation by W.H.S. Jones, Litt.D., and H.A. Ormerod, M.A., in 4 Volumes. Cambridge, MA, Harvard University Press; London, William Heinemann Ltd. 1918. . Online version at the Perseus Digital Library
Pausanias, Graeciae Descriptio. 3 vols. Leipzig, Teubner. 1903.  Greek text available at the Perseus Digital Library.
 Stephanus of Byzantium, Stephani Byzantii Ethnicorum quae supersunt, edited by August Meineike (1790-1870), published 1849. A few entries from this important ancient handbook of place names have been translated by Brady Kiesling. Online version at the Topos Text Project.

Family of Athamas
Boeotian characters in Greek mythology
Epithets of Apollo